Izvoru Bârzii is a commune located in Mehedinți County, Oltenia, Romania. It is composed of seven villages: Balotești, Halânga, Izvoru Bârzii, Puținei, Răscolești, Schinteiești and Schitu Topolniței.

Points of interest
 Romag-Termo Power Plant

References

Communes in Mehedinți County
Localities in Oltenia